Lavoûte-sur-Loire (literally Lavoûte on Loire) is a commune in the Haute-Loire department in south-central France.

Population

See also
Communes of the Haute-Loire department

References

External links
Webpage about Lavoûte-sur-Loire 

Communes of Haute-Loire